Psilogramma stameri is a moth of the  family Sphingidae. It is known from Sumatra and Java in Indonesia.

Subspecies
Psilogramma stameri stameri (Sumatra)
Psilogramma stameri chuai Eitschberger, 2001 (Java)

References

Stameri
Moths described in 2001
Moths of Indonesia
Endemic fauna of Indonesia